The Softball Association of India (SBAI) is the governing body for softball in India. Legally, it is a non-profit association registered under the Societies Registration Act, 1860.

History
Softball was first played in India in 1944 by United States Army servicemen stationed in Jodhpur, Rajasthan during World War II. Some locals played with the Americans and learned the game from them. Among them was Dashrath Mal Mehta, considered the father of Indian softball. Mehta founded the Softball Association of India in Jodhpur on 21 November 1961 with the support of L.M. Singhavi, Anand Singh Kachawa, Madanlal Pungalia, and K.D. Gautam. The Association came into contact with members of the International Softball Federation (ISF), the sport's international governing body, in 1964 and invited them to play a game in India. The SBAI officially became affiliated with the ISF in 1965.

The United States women's softball team visited India and played an exhibition game against an Indian team at Calcutta in 1965. The American team was accompanied by ISF President W.W. Khetan, Secretary Don A. Porter, Umpire in Chief Dickston who conducted the first official clinic for Indian softball umpires. The delegation also helped the SBAI publish the first rule book on softball in the country, and the system of umpiring the game.

The Association was officially recognized by the Indian Olympic Association in 1967, and in the same year, it organized the first National Softball Championship for men and women at Jodhpur in 1967. Teams from Andhra Pradesh, Delhi, Maharashtra and Rajasthan participated in the tournament. The SBAI was recognized by the Ministry of Sports and Youth Affairs in 1973.

References

External links

Sports governing bodies in India
Softball in India
1961 establishments in Madhya Pradesh
Sports organizations established in 1961
Organisations based in Indore